Cumingia is a genus of marine clams in the family Semelidae. It is also represented in the fossil record.

Cumingia lamellosa is an introduced species in Venezuela.

Species 

 Cumingia antillarum A.Adams, 1850
 Cumingia californica Conrad, 1837
 Cumingia coarctata G. B. Sowerby I, 1833
 Cumingia lamellosa (Sowerby, 1833)
 Cumingia mutica G.B.Sowerby, 1833
 Cumingia sinuosa A.Adams, 1850
 Cumingia tellinoides (Conrad, 1831)

 Names brought to synonymy
 Cumingia elegans G.B. Sowerby II, 1873 is a synonym for Thyellisca lamellosa (H. Adams, 1873)
 Cumingia parthenopaea Tiberi, 1855 is a synonym for Poromya granulata.

See also 
 List of marine molluscs of Venezuela

References 

 Adams, A. 1850. An arrangement of Stomatellidae, including the characters of a new genus Cumingia, with some additional generic characters. Proceedings of the Zoological Society of London 1850(18): 29-40, pl. 8

External links 

 
 
 Cumingia at Catalogue of Life

Semelidae
Bivalve genera